|date                     = August 2009

Alloa Academy is a six-year state-funded comprehensive school, serving the town of Alloa in Clackmannanshire, Scotland. The school currently has 89 teaching staff. The pupil intake comes from four "feeder" primary schools, Redwell, Sunnyside, St. Mungo's and Park, and varies from a middle class area to an area of severe deprivation. The school moved to its current location after Christmas 2008. The old building in the Claremont area of Alloa was built in 1859, opened by Queen Victoria and demolished in 2010. The new school is adjacent to the OI Glassworks (formerly United Glass). The school is in view of the River Forth. The school building also contains St. Mungo's Primary School as a temporary measure while the primary school has a new school building built.

Notable former pupils

Notable former pupils include:
Dougie Brown, England and Scotland cricketer
John Crawford Buchan, won the Victoria Cross during the Ludendorff offensive in March 1918
James Lennox Dawson, won the Victoria Cross at Loos in World War I
Dr Ian Alexander Forbes FRSE (1915-1986) industrial chemist, managing director of the Distillers Company Ltd 1966-1980
Charles Forte, Baron Forte, founder of Trust House Forte hotel group
William McEwan, brewer (uncle of George and Robert Younger) and Liberal politician
George Younger, Lord Blanesborough, principal delegate at the World War I reparations committee

References

Secondary schools in Clackmannanshire
Educational institutions established in 1859
Alloa
1859 establishments in Scotland